John Daley may refer to:

 John Daley (jockey) (1846–?)
 John Daley (baseball) (1887–1988), American baseball player
 John Daley (RAF officer) (1898–1918), World War I flying ace
 John Daley (cricketer) (1906–1986), English cricketer
 John Daley (boxer) (1909–1963), American boxer and Olympic silver medalist
 John J. Daley (1923–2000), American politician and 70th Lieutenant Governor of Vermont
 John M. Daley (1923–2015), American politician and member of the Illinois House of Representatives
 John P. Daley (born 1946), American politician and member of the Cook County Board of Commissioners
 John Francis Daley (born 1985), American actor

See also
 John Daly (disambiguation)